Space in Africa is a media, analytics and consulting company focusing on the African space and satellite industry with its headquarters in Lagos, Nigeria.

History 
The company was founded by Temidayo Isaiah Oniosun in 2018. Space in Africa was a finalist in the Fall 2018 NewSpace Business Plan Competition in Austin, TX.

In June 2019, the company released the African Space Industry Annual Report 2019 Edition which estimated the worth of the African space industry to be more than US$7 billion, projecting that it is likely to grow over 40% in the next five years, exceeding US$10 billion by 2024. 

In July 2019, Space in Africa received seed funding from AC Ventures. 

In October 2019, the company published the NewSpace Africa Industry Report, 2019 Edition which was an overview of 34 companies in the African space industry, with an emphasis on their size, financial and investment history, and their products and services, as they exist and interact with other elements in the global space ecosystem.

In August 2020, Space in Africa released the 2020 Edition of the African Space Industry Annual Report, which showed that the African space industry is still growing, with African government doubling their national space program operating budgets to an estimated USD 490 million compared to USD 250 million in 2019. The report also estimated that African countries will have launched at least 110 Satellites by 2024, compared to the total of 41 launched so far.

African Space Industry Top 10 Under 30 
Space in Africa curates the African Space Industry top 10-Under-30 award, which started in 2019. The list features engineers, scientists, business developers, researchers and academicians from all corners of Africa who have contributed not only developing their nation’s space industry, but also expanding knowledge in Africa’s evolving space sector. The 2020 award recipients are Angola, Ethiopia, Ghana, Morocco, Nigeria and South Africa.

References

External links 

 
 

2018 establishments in Nigeria
Companies based in Lagos